The 2019 Nigerian House of Representatives elections in Yobe State was held on February 23, 2019, to elect members of the House of Representatives to represent Yobe State, Nigeria.

Overview

Summary

Results

Bade/Jakusko 
A total of 12 candidates registered with the Independent National Electoral Commission to contest in the election. APC candidate Zakariya'u Galadima won the election, defeating PDP Hassan Kaikaku and 10 other party candidates. Galadima received 62.39% of the votes, while Kaikaku received 36.63%.

Bursari/Geidam/Yunusari 
A total of 2 candidates registered with the Independent National Electoral Commission to contest in the election. APC candidate Lawan Shettima Ali won the election, defeating PDP Hassan Abba. Ali received 88.49% of the votes, while Abba received 11.51%.

Damaturu/Gujba/Gulani/Tarmuwa 
A total of 2 candidates registered with the Independent National Electoral Commission to contest in the election. APC candidate Khadija Bukar Abba Ibrahim won the election, defeating PDP Habu Babayo. Ibrahim received 88.25% of the votes, while Babayo received 11.75%.

Fika/Fune 
A total of 3 candidates registered with the Independent National Electoral Commission to contest in the election. APC candidate Abubakar Yerima won the election, defeating PDP Zainab Boni Haruna and 1 other candidate. Yerima received 64.29% of the votes, while Boni Haruna received 35.40%.

Machina/Nguru/Yusufari/Karasuwa 
A total of 2 candidates registered with the Independent National Electoral Commission to contest in the election. APC candidate Tijjani Zannah Zakariya won the election, defeating PDP Ali Garba. Zakariya received 76.08% of the votes, while Garba received 23.92%.

Nangere/Potiskum 
A total of 4 candidates registered with the Independent National Electoral Commission to contest in the election. APC candidate Ibrahim-Umar Potiskum won the election, defeating PDP Sabo Garba and 2 other party candidates. Potiskum received 57.29% of the votes, while Garba received 36.87%.

References 

Yobe State House of Representatives elections
House of Representatives
Yobe